Matunggong is a state constituency in Sabah, Malaysia, that is represented in the Sabah State Legislative Assembly.

History

Representation history

Election results

References

Sabah state constituencies